István Kovács (born 28 February 1957 in Budapest, Hungary) is a Hungarian water polo player and coach. He was the head coach of the Romania men's national water polo team at the 2012 Summer Olympics in London, where his team finished tenth in the end.

References

External links
 

1957 births
Living people
Water polo players from Budapest
Hungarian male water polo players
Hungarian water polo coaches
Romania men's national water polo team coaches
Water polo coaches at the 2012 Summer Olympics